The A150 autoroute is a short motorway north west of Rouen, France.

Route

01 Exchange with RD982 and N15 the Rue du Mont Riboulet.
02 Maromme 3 km Towns served: Maromme, Notre Dame de Bondeville
Service Area 5 km La Vaupalière (Southbound)
Service AreaSt Jean du Cardonnay North Esso*Exchange A151'' Junction with the A151 autoroute to Dieppe.
03 Autoroute merges with the N15 towards Le Havre via Yvetot.

References

External links
 Official site of ALBEA
 A150 autoroute in Saratlas

A150